Dilşa Demirbağ-Sten is a Kurdish-Swedish author and journalist. She is the Secretary General of Berättarministeriet, a foundation she co-founded together with Robert Weil and Sven Hagströmer in 2011.

In 2019, she became a member of the Swedish Press Council and is a member of the reference group for the Swedish government agency Delegation against segregation since 2018. She is also a member of the expert council to The Swedish Crown Princess Couple's Foundation. Dilsa Demirbag-Sten is a former member of the Swedish Globalization Council, has been a member of the reference group for the Swedish government agency Kulturrådet. Demirbag-Sten is a former board member of the AllBright foundation the Riksteatern, the Swedish Institute, Linnéuniversitetet, the Swedish Red Cross, the Swedish Humanist Association as well as from the Think Tank FORES. In April 2019, she was appointed a board member of the Nobel Center Foundation.

Demirbag-Sten has a background in journalism and has been a frequent contributor in Swedish newspapers such as Expressen, Östgöta Correspondenten, Göteborgs-Posten, Dagens Nyheter, Fokus and Axess. She has worked at Riksteatern, Amnesty International and as a special adviser to the former Swedish Minister for Integration Leif Blomberg. She holds a Bachelor of Arts degree in political science and history from Stockholm University.

Accolades 

 2019: KTH Great Prize (Royal institute of Technology's great prize)  
2018: Awarded the St:Erik medal for her contributions to Stockholm county.
 2017: Demirbag-Sten was awarded the Astrid Lindgren scholarship for her writing.
 2016: Awarded "Eldsjälspriset" by the Oscar Hirsch Memory foundation for her contribution to society through Berättarministeriet.
 2012: Awarded Frihetspennan in the memory of Torgny Segerstedt for her writing.
2012: Alumni of the year, Karlstad University
2012: Bild och Ord Akademin Ann-Marie Lunds Encyklopedipris  
2011: Stockholm County award "Månadens Stockholmare" September 
2010: Natur och Kulturs Johan Hansson-pris för boken Fosterland 
2010: Magen David Adom utmärkelsen som "Årets Livräddare" 
2009: Advokatsamfundets journalistpris  
 2002: Axel and Margret Ax:son Johnson Foundation’s award of SEK 100 000

Works
Stamtavlor 2005 Norstedts
Fosterland 2010 Bonniers
Svenska - en nödvändighet 1995 Stift. Non-Violence Sweden

As co-writer
Från Alfons till Dostojevskij. Co-writer. Rädda Barnen 
Makten framför allt. Co-writer. W&W
Violence in The Name of Honour. Co-writer. Istanbul Bilgi University Press
Tystade röster. Co-writer. Tranan. 
Handbook against Violence, Department of Justice (editorial contribution)
Till frihetens försvar: En kritik av den normativa mångkulturalismen Norstedts (tillsammans med Per Bauhn)

Notes

Swedish atheism activists
Turkish Kurdish people
Swedish people of Kurdish descent
Swedish journalists
Swedish women writers
Kurdish writers
Kurdish women writers
Turkish emigrants to Sweden
Swedish television journalists
Stockholm University alumni
Swedish atheists
1969 births
Living people
Swedish humanists
Turkish former Muslims
Turkish atheists
Kurdish atheists
Kurdish women poets
Former Muslim critics of Islam
Women television journalists
Swedish poets
Swedish women poets
Turkish poets
Turkish women poets
Kurdish women journalists
Kurdish journalists